Presidential elections were held in Kenya on 8 November 1978, the first not to be held concurrently with parliamentary elections. They followed the death in office of President Jomo Kenyatta in August 1978. The then-Vice President, Daniel arap Moi, who was sworn in as Acting President for a 90-day interim period beginning at the moment of Kenyatta's death, was the sole candidate and was automatically elected without a vote being held.

References

Bibliography

1978
One-party elections
1978 in Kenya
Kenya
Uncontested elections
Single-candidate elections